André Buffard (17 November 1925 – 20 July 2017) was a French cross-country skier who competed in the 1948 Winter Olympics.

References

1925 births
2017 deaths
French male cross-country skiers
Olympic cross-country skiers of France
Cross-country skiers at the 1948 Winter Olympics
Sportspeople from Doubs